Andrian Mardare (born 20 June 1995) is a Moldovan athlete specialising in the javelin throw. He represented his country at the 2017 World Championships without qualifying for the final. Additionally, he won the bronze medal at the 2017 European U23 Championships.

His personal best in the event is 86.66 in 2021.

International competitions

References

1995 births
Living people
Moldovan male javelin throwers
World Athletics Championships athletes for Moldova
European Games competitors for Moldova
Athletes (track and field) at the 2015 European Games
Universiade gold medalists in athletics (track and field)
Universiade gold medalists for Moldova
Competitors at the 2017 Summer Universiade
Medalists at the 2019 Summer Universiade
Athletes (track and field) at the 2020 Summer Olympics
Olympic athletes of Moldova